N R Govindarajar an Indian politician from All India Anna Dravida Munnetra Kazhagam and a previous member of the Parliament of India representing Tamil Nadu in the Rajya Sabha, the upper house of the Indian Parliament. He contested the 2004 Indian General Elections from Gobichettipalayam (Lok Sabha constituency) and lost to E. V. K. S. Elangovan.

Election results

External links
 Profile on Rajya Sabha website

Rajya Sabha members from Tamil Nadu
All India Anna Dravida Munnetra Kazhagam politicians
Living people
Year of birth missing (living people)